The following is the detailed result of the 2011 Tamil Nadu Legislative Assembly election.

Detailed result

Result by pre-poll alliance

|-
! style="background-color:#E9E9E9;text-align:left;vertical-align:top;" |Alliance/Party
!style="width:4px" |
! style="background-color:#E9E9E9;text-align:right;" |Seats won
! style="background-color:#E9E9E9;text-align:right;" |Change
! style="background-color:#E9E9E9;text-align:right;" |Popular vote
! style="background-color:#E9E9E9;text-align:right;" |Vote %
! style="background-color:#E9E9E9;text-align:right;" |Adj. %‡
|-
! style="background-color:#009900; color:white"|AIADMK+ alliance
! style="background-color: " |
| 203
| +130
| 19,085,762
| colspan=2 style="text-align:center;vertical-align:middle;"| 51.9%
|-
|AIADMK
! style="background-color: " | 
| 150
| +93
| 14,150,289
| 38.4%
| 53.9%
|-
|DMDK
! style="background-color: #008080" |
| 29
| +28
| 2,903,828
| 7.9%
| 44.8%
|-
|CPI(M)
! style="background-color: #000080" |
| 10
| +1
| 888,364
| 2.4%
| 50.3%
|-
|CPI
! style="background-color: #0000FF" |
| 9
| +3
| 727,394
| 2.0%
| 48.6%
|-
|MNMK
! style="background-color: #FF00FF" |
| 2
| +2
| 181,180
| 0.5%
| 42.4%
|-
|PT
! style="background-color: Black" |
| 2
| +2
| 146,454
| 0.4%
| 54.3%
|- 
|AIFB
! style="background-color: #800000" |
| 1
| +1
| 88,253
| 0.2%
| 51.2%
|-
! style="background-color:#FF0000; color:white"|DMK+ alliance
! style="background-color: Red" |
| 31
| -126
| 14,530,215
| colspan=2 style="text-align:center;vertical-align:middle;"| 39.5%
|-
|DMK
! style="background-color: Red" |
| 23
| -77
| 8,249,991
| 22.4%
| 42.1%
|-
|INC
! style="background-color: #00FFFF" |
| 5
| -32
| 3,426,432
| 9.3%
| 35.6%
|-
|PMK
! style="background-color: #800080" |
| 3
| -15
| 1,927,783
| 5.2%
| 39.6%
|-
|VCK
! style="background-color: " |
| 0
| -2
| 555,965
| 1.5%
| 34.0%
|-
|KMK
! style="background-color: " |
| 0
| –
| 370,044
| 1.0%
| 32.5%
|-
! style="background-color:Gray; color:white"|Others
! style="background-color: " |
| 0
| -4
| 3,137,137
| colspan=2 style="text-align:center;vertical-align:middle;"|8.5%
|-
|BJP
! style="background-color: " |
| 0
| –
| 819,577
| 2.2%
| 2.6%
|-
|MDMK†
! style="background-color: " |
| –
| -3
| –
| –
| –
|-
|IND and others
! style="background-color: " |
| 0
| -1
| 2,120,476
| 5.8%
| N/A
|-
| style="text-align:center;" |Total
! style="background-color: " |
| 234
| –
| 36,845,373
| 100%
| –
|-
| style="text-align:left;" colspan="4" |Valid votes
| align="right" | 36,845,373
| align="right" |99.89
| colspan="4" rowspan="5" style="background-color:#E9E9E9"  |
|-
| style="text-align:left;" colspan="4" |Invalid votes
| align="right" |40,853
| align="right" |0.11
|-
| style="text-align:left;" colspan="4" |Votes cast / turnout
| align="right" | 36,886,226 
| align="right" | 78.29
|-
| style="text-align:left;" colspan="4" |Abstentions
| align="right" | 10,229,620
| align="right" |21.71
|-
| style="text-align:left;" colspan="4" |Registered voters
| align="right" |47,115,846  
|colspan="1" style="background-color:#E9E9E9"|
|-
|}
†: MDMK left the AIADMK alliance due to failed seat sharing talks and boycotted this election.
‡: Vote % reflects the percentage of votes the party received compared to the entire electorate that voted in this election. Adjusted (Adj.) Vote %, reflects the average % of votes the party received per constituency that they contested.
Sources: Election Commission of India and Hindu Newspaper

District wise result

Results by constituency 

P. Vetrivel resigned on 17 May 2015.

References 

2011
2010s in Tamil Nadu
2011 State Assembly elections in India
Results of State Assembly elections in India